Anthidona is a former municipality in the Euboea regional unit, Greece. It was named after the ancient Boeotian city Anthedon. During the 2011 local government reform, it became a municipal unit of Chalcis. The population was 7,309 inhabitants at the 2011 census, and the land area is 137.266 km². The seat of the municipality was in Drosia. Although part of the Euboea regional unit, it is not located on the island Euboea, but on the mainland, attached to the northeastern part of Boeotia.

External links
Map

References

Populated places in Euboea (regional unit)